The Rivals is a 1931 painting by the Mexican artist Diego Rivera (1886–1957). The work was commissioned by Abby Aldrich Rockefeller, the leading personage behind the inception of the Museum of Modern Art in New York City.  The artist created the work on the way on the ship SS Moro en route from Mexico to New York City.  The picture portrays "Las Velas", a festival held in the Mexican state of Oaxaca, a fete in honor of local patron saints and of the abundance of spring.

Abby Rockefeller kept the work in her own private collection until 1940 when she bequested it to her son David Rockefeller and his wife Peggy Rockefeller (the former Peggy McGrath) as a wedding present.  The couple exhibited the work in the living room of their summer home, Ringing Point, in Maine.

At auction
In 2017, following David Rockefeller's death at the age of 101 the work sold for $9.7 million at auction at Christie's, then a record for a work by a Latin American artist. In 2021 the aforementioned sales mark was shattered by Diego and I (1949) by Rivera's wife, the surrealist painter, Frida Kahlo (1907–1954) which sold at Sotheby's in New York City for $34.9 million US.  Meanwhile, in his wife's record setting self-portrait Rivera appears upon her forehead.

It was later revealed that the painting had bought by the tech billionaire Paul Allen in the last year of his life and it was 
Subsequently sold for $14.1 million US (with fees) at the record-setting auction of his art collection in November 2022 at Christie's in New York City.

References

1931 paintings
Paintings by Diego Rivera